New Digamber Public School Ground is ground located in the campus of New Digamber Public School, Indore, Madhya Pradesh. The ground was founded in 2001. The ground has got pavilion and can accommodate 5000 persons. It has basketball and volleyball courts and a five international level cricket practice nets along with one gymnasium hall. It also has facilities for swimming, table tennis, billiards, and tennis courts. It has one main clubhouse.

The ground has hosted two List A matches when Rajasthan cricket team played against Vidarbha cricket team in 2009 Vijay Hazare Trophy. The ground has hosted one more List A match Rajasthan cricket team played against Railways cricket team in 2009. Since then the ground has hosted non-first-class matches.

References

External links
Cricinfo profile
Cricketarchive.com

Sports venues in Indore
Cricket grounds in Madhya Pradesh
Multi-purpose stadiums in India
2001 establishments in Madhya Pradesh
Sports venues completed in 2001